Bristol & West Building Society v Henning [1985] EWCA Civ 6 is an English land law case that holds a person can consent to give up the right to an overriding interest in land, that will bind third parties, such as banks, that purchase a property. Although dealing with unregistered land, it is equally applicable in the case of registered land and now falls under the Land Registration Act 2002.

Facts
Mr Henning lived with a lady from 1974 to 1981 but was not married. They had two children. They got a house in London in 1975 with a mortgage and it was all in his name. She made contributions and did work. In 1978 they agreed to buy a villa and large Devonshire garden, where she would begin a self-sufficiency project. This was bought in his name alone for £12,900, with an £11k mortgage from the building society. His application described her as his wife and said it was for their family. She worked on the property, did buildings and decorated and earned small sums for the family budget. He left in February 1981, and in December 1981 he started possession proceedings. It ended with a consent order where he said at all times he intended her to have a one half share of the house. He stopped to pay the mortgage after, and the building society proceeded for a possession order. He did not resist the claim. The building society accepted that she had an irrevocable licence to stay in the villa.

The Judge refused the possession order saying an irrevocable licence gave her some property interest. The building society appealed.

Judgment
Browne-Wilkinson LJ held that the building society was entitled to take possession because the lady could show no beneficial interest under a constructive trust that had priority over the building society's interest. Mr Henning never had the intention of giving her a beneficial interest, and without an express or imputed intention, it was impossible to create a common intention constructive trust.

Sir John Donaldson MR and Lloyd LJ concurred.

See also

English land law

Notes

References

English property case law
Court of Appeal (England and Wales) cases
1985 in British law
1985 in case law